Matthew Church (born 2 December 1965) is an Australian professional rugby league football coach, and is the Head Coach of the Brisbane Tigers.

Coaching career

On 15 October 2021, it was announced that Church was reappointed for another year as head coach of the PNG Hunters.

References

1965 births
Living people
Australian rugby league coaches